Laurel is an unincorporated community, in Sevier County, Tennessee, on State Route 416 (Tennessee), north of U.S. Route 321, in the Great Smoky Mountains.

External links

Unincorporated communities in Sevier County, Tennessee
Unincorporated communities in Tennessee